The Associated Pentecostal Churches of New Zealand is a fellowship of Pentecostal bodies in New Zealand founded in 1975.
Members are: 
 Pentecostal Church of New Zealand (Elim Pentecostal Church), 
 Assemblies of God in New Zealand, 
 New Life Churches, New Zealand

References

Pentecostalism in New Zealand

Christian organizations established in 1975